Nurteria bicolor is a species of fly first described by Octave Parent in 1934. It belongs to the genus Nurteria and the family Dolichopodidae.

References

Sympycninae
Taxa named by Octave Parent
Insects described in 1934